The IPS/UPS is a wide area synchronous transmission grid of some CIS countries, with a common mode of operation and centralized supervisory control.  It has an installed generation capacity of 300 gigawatts, and produces 1,200 terawatt-hours (TWh) per year for its 280 million customers.  The system spans eight time zones.

History
The unified power system was started in 1956 by interconnecting the power systems of Center and Middle Volga. By 1978, the unified power system included all of the Soviet Union except Central Asia.

In 1979–1993 the power systems of Poland, German Democratic Republic, Czechoslovakia, Hungary, Romania and Bulgaria, now part of the synchronous grid of Continental Europe (ENTSO-E), operated synchronously with the Unified Power System of the USSR.

Central Asian countries (excluding Turkmenistan) were added to the integrated system in 2001. In 2009, Uzbekistan disconnected from the system resulting also in the disconnection of Tajikistan. In 2022, Ukraine disconnected, resulting in the disconnection of Moldova.

UPS
The Russian portion of the interconnection is known as Unified Power System of Russia (UPS) and includes six regional transmission operators: ECO Center, ECO South, ECO North-West, ECO Middle Volga, ECO Urals and ECO Siberia. ECO East operates in isolation from UPS of Russia.

UPS of Russia came into existence as a result of Russian Federation Decision #526 dated 11 July 2001 "On the Restructuring of the Russian Federation United Energy System".  Up until 1 July 2008 RAO UES operated UPS.  It is currently being operated by the Federal Grid Company (FGC UES) of Russia.

IPS
The Integrated Power System (IPS) portion of the network includes the national networks of Kazakhstan, Kyrgyzstan, Belarus, Azerbaijan, Georgia, and Mongolia.

In early 2021 Ukraine announced that it would be disconnecting from Russia and Belarus by the end of 2023 and integrating into the continental European grid. In February 2022, Ukraine disconnected due to the 2022 Russian invasion of Ukraine, also disconnecting Moldova. In early March 2022, Ukraine completed an emergency synchronization with the European grid.

Interconnections with other systems
IPS/UPS is synchronously interconnected with the Baltic countries. In addition, it has an interlink to the Nordic system via a back-to-back high-voltage direct current (HVDC) connection to Finland with a capacity of 1420 megawatts.

In 2005, Russia and the EU considered unifying the IPS/UPS network with the ENTSO-E to form a single synchronous super grid spanning 13 time zones. There was also a proposal to interconnect the Russian grid to China and other Asian systems with HVDC links as part of an Asian Super Grid.

See also
European Network of Transmission System Operators for Electricity (ENTSO-E)
SuperSmart Grid - proposal for combining ENTSO-E, IPS/UPS and some Middle East networks with smart grid capabilities
European super grid

References

Wide area synchronous grids
Electric power transmission systems in Europe
Electric power transmission systems in Asia
Electric power infrastructure in Russia